The Lupoaia is a left tributary of the river Motru in Romania. It flows into the Motru near the village Lupoaia.

References

Rivers of Romania
Rivers of Gorj County